HM Prison La Moye is a mixed-use prison in the island of Jersey. La Moye is currently Jersey's only prison, and is situated within the boundaries of the Vingtaine de la Moye. It is operated by the Jersey Prison Service, part of the Department of Home Affairs.

The prison was opened in the mid-1970s and originally built to house 150 inmates. Because La Moye is the island's only jail, it has to provide accommodation for men, women and vulnerable prisoners. Unfortunately young offenders wing was closed due to no funding.  Consequently, there are four distinctive areas of the prison which have been set aside for each category of inmate.

Facilities

The prison has an active education programme and all prisoners are encouraged to participate. Prisoners are usually assessed to determine their level of education within a short time of arriving at La Moye. Inmates can study both academic and vocational qualifications. La Moye also has a library which was opened in November 2007.

Overcrowding concerns

In July 2005 a report from HM Inspector of Prisons stated the prison had 172 inmates, with capacity for 184. This led to concerns about possible overcrowding at the prison. In November 2007, Jersey's Home Affairs Minister Wendy Kinnard expressed fears that Jersey had a higher pro rata prison population when compared to other European countries of a similar size. She called for alternative punishments to be introduced to ease pressure on the prison.

Notable inmates

Inmates of La Moye Prison have included;
 John Hervey, 7th Marquess of Bristol, British aristocrat and businessman
 Curtis Warren, English gangster, subsequently transferred to HMP Belmarsh

References

External links
 Jersey Prison Service
 Prison Me No Way information on La Moye Prison's Young Offenders Unit
 HMI Report 2006 

Prisons in Jersey
Buildings and structures in Saint Brélade